Harandeh (also Romanized as Harāndeh; also known as Haram Deh) is a village in Shahrabad Rural District, in the Central District of Firuzkuh County, Tehran Province, Iran. At the 2006 census, its population was 437, in 120 families.

References 

Populated places in Firuzkuh County